Israel Sports Radio is an Israeli radio broadcast founded by Ari Louis, Andrew Gershman and Joshua Halickman. Louis is the currently the sole owner of the station. It is the country's only English all-sports talk radio broadcast. Combining coverage of niche sports in Israel – American football, soccer, basketball, baseball, fitness and other professional and American sports.

The station features the Joe Morgan Show and the Ron Barr Show, but its flagship show is Louis Live hosted by Ari Louis.

Louis Live has featured some of the most famous names in Sports and Entertainment, such as Pete Rose, Roy Jones Jr., Curt Schilling, Yael Averbuch, Jesse James Leija, Alan Veingrad, Dmitriy Salita, Yuri Foreman, Robert Kraft, Brad Greenberg, Dan Shulman, Alan Veingrad, Larry Brown, Herb Brown, Andy Katz, Tamar Katz, Zack Rosen, Shay Doron, Tamir Linhart, Gal Nevo, Shlomo Glickstein, Diana Redman, Shawn James, Bruce Jacobs, Bram Weinstein, Aaron Cohen, Guy Goodes, Melanie Weisner, Dan Duquette, Barry Tompkins, Dan Shulman, Tommy Smyth, Brad Stevens, Brad Ausmus, Shyne, Kevin Gilbride, Eric Nystrom, Sylven Landesberg, David Blu, Guma Aguiar, Brin-Jonathan Butler, Jermaine Jackson, John Thomas, James Tillis, Bernie Fine, Charles Grodin, Shelly Saltman, Miami Heat co-owner Raanan Katz, Maccabi Haifa owner Jeffery Rosen, Oakland Athletics owner Lewis Woolf, Amar'e Stoudemire, Jay Glazer, Mike Hill, Steve Bunin, CBS Radios' Amy Lawrence, former Detroit Lions player Caleb Campbell, Ran Nakash, Shay Doron, MTV Jason Miller, Barry Tompkins, Arash Markazi, Pat Farmer, Adonal Foyle, Adrian Banks, Brad Ausmus, Brad Stevens, Derek Sharp, Gerry DiNardo, Kenny Albert, Ilya Grad, Samaki Walker, Andy Ram, Rade Prica.

Louis has been in talks with Sirius Satelitte Radio and Fox Sports about having a show on their respective stations.
http://www.jpost.com/Sports/Israel-Sports-Radio-set-to-expand-its-reach

Louis Live can currently be heard every Tuesday night at 12:00 p.m. (Est.), 7:00 p.m. (Israel time) on http://www.tlv1.fm.

See also
Sports in Israel

References

External links
https://web.archive.org/web/20130916011013/http://tlv1.fm/shows-programming/2013/08/30/louis-live-sports-ari-louis/
https://www.youtube.com/watch?v=yT4Y8EFghPY
https://web.archive.org/web/20150103202644/http://www.israelsportsradio.com/
http://www.jpost.com/Sports/Home.aspx
http://www.ynetnews.com/articles/0,7340,L-3962255,00.html
http://www.haaretz.com/print-edition/sports/sports-talk-radio-station-to-debut-today-1.317021
https://web.archive.org/web/20120925222612/http://www.jta.org/news/article/2010/10/04/2741118/israel-gets-all-sports-talk-radio
http://www.vosizneias.com/65329/2010/10/04/jerusalem-all-sports-talk-radio-debuts-in-israel
http://www.thejc.com/news/uk-news/46085/hes-got-israel-going-radio-gaga
https://archive.today/20130629091740/http://b1.jpost.com/Sports/Article.aspx?id=276485
Radio in Israel
Sports radio stations